The 1928 Army Cadets football team represented the United States Military Academy in the 1928 college football season. Led by head coach Biff Jones, the team finished the season with a record of 8–2. The Cadets offense scored 215 points, while the defense allowed 79 points. The team was ranked No. 9 in the nation in the Dickinson System ratings released in December 1928. The 1928 season was one of the few years in which Army did not play the Navy Midshipmen in the Army–Navy Game.

Against Notre Dame at Yankee Stadium, with the game scoreless at halftime, legendary Notre Dame coach Knute Rockne gave his "win one for the Gipper" speech (with reference to All-American halfback George Gipp, who died in 1920); Notre Dame went on to win,    Army participated in the best-attended college football game at Yankee Stadium on December 1, when Army lost to Stanford 26–0 before 86,000.

Schedule

References

Army
Army Black Knights football seasons
Army Cadets football